DXCH (90.3 FM), broadcasting as 90.3 Charm Radio, is a radio station owned and operated by the Polytechnic Foundation of Cotabato & Asia. The station's studio and Transmitter are located along Datu Icdang St. cor. Quezon Blvd., Kidapawan.

References

Radio stations established in 2002
Radio stations in Cotabato